Chaylu or Ch’aylu may refer to:
Çaylı, Tartar, Azerbaijan
Nerkin Chaylu, Azerbaijan
Chaylu, Iran, a village in Golestan Province, Iran

See also
Chayli (disambiguation)